Polystomurum is a Devonian genus from Siberia, Russia (then the Soviet Union). It was initially described by Nestor Novojilov in 1958 as a eurypterid with affinities to Marsupipterus inside the family Stylonuridae. Nowadays, it is classified as incertae sedis inside Euchelicerata.

References

Cited bibliography

Controversial taxa
Devonian animals of Asia
Devonian arthropods
Euchelicerata
Fossils of Russia
Fossil taxa described in 1958